Astha Raut (born 30 April ) is a singer from Nepal. Her first hit song was a remix song Saal Ko Paata Tapari (सालकाे पात टपरी) from a collection album Addiction 2. She received the Hits FM Music Best Female Pop Vocal Award in 2014. Her second song Maya Yo Maya (माया याे माया) was from the movie Maya's Bar. Two of her songs Chaubandi Ma Patuki and Jhumke Bulaki from her album Aadhar released on 17 Asad 2070 (B.S.) became superhits. She has also sung many playback songs in Nepali films. Astha Raut is one of the coaches in The Voice of Nepal Season 2(2019) & her second album (Aadhar 2) was launched on 28 November 2019.

Early life and background
Astha is the daughter of Nepali folk singer Hari Bahadur Raut and lyricist Sabitri Raut. She was born in kathmandu capital of Nepal on 30 April (17th baisakh). She completed her school and high school in Kathmandu for her higher studies and received a bachelor's degree from CG Manipal Campion College. She was interested in singing and dancing since childhood and participated in many singing competitions and won many of them.

Aadhar album songs
Adhar Bhag-1 
Jhumke Bulaki
Teen Mohar Ko Dhago
Kadam Chala
Ma Ruda
Birsi Deu
Chaubandi Ma Patuki
Phatyo Ni Maiti Ko Chino

Adhar Bhag-2 
Ko cha Yaha
Nakai ma Fuli 
Kampany Mala
Ram Saile 
Simana
Hawaijahaj ko Tiket 
Dashain Ayo Tihar Ayo

Movie film songs
Maya Yo Maya (Maya's Bar)
Chalak Chalak (Dhuwani)
Baal Matlab (Lanka)

Awards
Best Pop Female Vocal (Hits FM Music Award 2014)
Best Pop Female Vocal (Image Award 2014)
Best Pop Female Vocal (Kantipur Honours)

References

External links
 

Living people
Nepalese songwriters
21st-century Nepalese women singers
People from Kathmandu
People from Dolakha District
Dohori singers
1990 births